Małgorzata Gebel (born 30 November 1955) is a Polish actress. She is best known for her performance as Wiktoria Klonowska in Schindler's List and as Dr. Bogdana 'Bob' Liwecki in ER.

Filmography
Angry Harvest (1985) - Frau Rubin
Rosa Luxemburg (1986)
 (1988) - Tina
Judgment in Berlin (1988) - Beata Levandovska
Land der Väter, Land der Söhne (1988) - Klaudia
Schindler's List (1993) - Wiktoria Klonowska
Transatlantis (1995) - Solveig
ER (1994-1995) -  ER aide (Dr.) Bogdana "Bob" Liwecki

References

External links
 

1955 births
Living people
People from Katowice
Polish people of German descent
Polish film actresses
Polish television actresses